Lieutenant General Gerardo Pérez Pinedo Airport  is a small regional airport serving the town of Atalaya, in the Ucayali Region of Peru. The town is at the confluence of the Tambo and Ucayali Rivers.

The airport name in Spanish is Aeropuerto Teniente General Gerardo Pérez Pinedo, with Teniente General often abbreviated as Tnte. Gral. The airport is currently served by one scheduled airline, and it receives also private and charter flights.

Airlines and Destinations

See also
Transport in Peru
List of airports in Peru

References

External links 
Atalaya Airport
SkyVector Aeronautical Charts
OpenStreetMap - Atalaya

Airports in Peru
Buildings and structures in Ucayali Region